Milledge Luke Bonham (December 25, 1813August 27, 1890) was an American politician and Congressman. He was later the 70th Governor of South Carolina from 1862 until 1864, and a Confederate General during the American Civil War.

Early life and career
Milledge L. Bonham was born near Redbank (now Saluda), South Carolina, the son of Maryland native Capt. James Bonham and Sophie Smith Bonham, the niece of Capt. James Butler, who was the head of an illustrious South Carolina family. Milledge was a 1st cousin once removed to Andrew Pickens Butler. He attended private schools in the Edgefield District and at Abbeville. He graduated with honors from South Carolina College at Columbia in 1834. He served as Captain and adjutant general of the South Carolina Brigade in the Seminole War in Florida in 1836. That same year, his older brother James Butler Bonham perished at the Battle of the Alamo.

Bonham studied law and was admitted to the bar, in 1837, and commenced practice in Edgefield. During the Mexican–American War, he was lieutenant colonel (from March 1847) and colonel (from August 1847) of the 12th US Infantry Regiment. Two other members of his regiment, Major Maxcy Gregg and Captain Abner Monroe Perrin, would also become generals in the Civil War. After he returned home, Bonham was the major general of the South Carolina Militia. Entering politics, he served in the state house of representatives from 1840–1843. He married Ann Patience Griffin on November 13, 1845. Bonham was solicitor of the southern circuit of South Carolina from 1848–1857. He was elected as a Democrat to the Thirty-fifth United States Congress (succeeding his cousin, Preston Smith Brooks) and the Thirty-sixth United States Congress, and served from March 4, 1857, until his retirement on December 21, 1860.

Civil War
In early 1861, the Southern states that had seceded from the Union appointed special commissioners to travel to those other slaveholding Southern states that had yet to secede. Bonham served as the Commissioner from South Carolina to the Mississippi Secession Convention, and helped to persuade its members that they should also secede from the Union.

Bonham was appointed major general and commander of the Army of South Carolina by Gov. Francis W. Pickens in February 1861. He was appointed brigadier general in the Confederate Army on April 19, 1861, and commanded the First Brigade of the Confederate "Army of the Potomac" under P.G.T. Beauregard. He fought in the First Battle of Manassas, commanding his brigade as well as two artillery batteries and six companies of cavalry in the defense of Mitchell's Ford on Bull Run.

He resigned his commission January 27, 1862, to enter the Confederate Congress. On December 17, 1862, the South Carolina General Assembly elected Bonham as governor by secret ballot. He served until December 1864. During his term, the General Assembly enacted a prohibition against distilling in 1863 and also that year, it demanded that more land be used to grow food instead of cotton to increase the supply of food in the state. Bonham rejoined the Confederate Army as brigadier general of cavalry in February 1865, and was actively engaged in recruiting when the war ended.

Near Greenville, South Carolina a group of troops positioned there, because of worry of federal invasion from North Carolina, named their emplacement, Camp Bonham, in his honor.

Dates of rank
 Major General (South Carolina Militia), February 10, 1861
 Brigadier General, April 23, 1861
 Brigadier General, February 20, 1865

Postbellum activities
Bonham owned an insurance business in Edgefield and in Atlanta, Georgia, from 1865 to 1878. Returning to politics, Bonham was again a member of the South Carolina House of Representatives  from 1865–1866 and a delegate to the Democratic National Convention in 1868. He was a member of the South Carolina taxpayers’ convention in 1871 and 1874. Retiring from public service, he resumed the practice of law in Edgefield and engaged in planting. He was appointed state railroad commissioner in 1878 and served until his death at White Sulphur Springs, West Virginia. He was buried in Elmwood Cemetery in Columbia.

I have two newspaper obituaries (Fisherman and Farmer, Edenton, N.C. 12 Sept 1890 and Swain County Herald, Bryson City, N.C. from 11 Sep 1890) that report General Milledge L. Bonham, railroad commissioner, was found dead in his bed in his room at Hawood, White Sulphur Springs, North Carolina from hemorrhage during the night.  WSS, North Carolina was a late-nineteenth resort in Surry County near Mount Airy, N.C.

See also
 List of American Civil War Generals (Confederate)
 Bonham House

References

 Eicher, John H., and David J. Eicher, Civil War High Commands. Stanford: Stanford University Press, 2001. .
 Sifakis, Stewart. Who Was Who in the Civil War. New York: Facts On File, 1988. .
 Warner, Ezra J. Generals in Gray: Lives of the Confederate Commanders. Baton Rouge: Louisiana State University Press, 1959. .

External links
 Retrieved on 2008-02-13
 SCIway Biography of Milledge Luke Bonham
 NGA Biography of Milledge Luke Bonham

People of South Carolina in the American Civil War
1813 births
1890 deaths
People from Saluda, South Carolina
University of South Carolina alumni
South Carolina lawyers
Democratic Party members of the South Carolina House of Representatives
United States Army officers
American military personnel of the Mexican–American War
Members of the Aztec Club of 1847
South Carolina state solicitors
American militia generals
Confederate militia generals
Confederate States Army brigadier generals
Members of the Confederate House of Representatives from South Carolina
Democratic Party governors of South Carolina
University of South Carolina trustees
Confederate States of America state governors
Democratic Party members of the United States House of Representatives from South Carolina
19th-century American politicians
19th-century American lawyers
American slave owners